Highway 929 is a provincial highway in the north-west region of the Canadian province of Saskatchewan. It runs from Highway 916 to a dead end near the north shore of Smoothstone Lake. Highway 929 is about 30 km (20 mi) long.

See also 
Roads in Saskatchewan
Transportation in Saskatchewan

References 

929